Quezon National High School (QNHS) is a major public secondary science high school in Brgy. Ibabang Iyam, Lucena City, Philippines. It is one of the largest contingent national high schools in the Philippines, both by size and by population, with more than 11,000 enrollees from Grades 7 to Grade 12.

Aside from offering the K-12 Basic Education Curriculum, it also offers many different subjects and electives through its various Special Programs, with specific curricula for Science, Technology and Engineering (STE), Journalism (SPJ), Arts (SPA), Sports (SPS), and Foreign Languages (SPFL).

History 

Tayabas High School (now Quezon National High School) was founded in October 1902 when Aubrey Boyles, a Thomasite, organized a school in a convent of Lucena on the northern side of Saint Ferdinand Parish Church (now Lucena Cathedral). Fifty students were exposed to the English language with 19 American teachers.

The increase in student population on March 1, 1903, made Henry Balch the new principal. A strong typhoon destroyed the convent on September 26, 1905, that forced the school to be transferred to a building on Granja Street.

A two-storey building was built on June 6, 1906. Since then, a number of principals have stood at the helm of the school. When Japanese atrocities reached Atimonan, Quezon on December 23, 1941, students continued to flock to Tayabas High School and were automatically promoted. After a year, classes resumed at the Lucena Elementary School (now Lucena West) for girls and at the Trade School for boys. The Gabaldon Building (ruined by a fire) became the Provincial Hospital.

Classes were transferred to the Tong Ho School Building in 1944. The formal liberation of Tayabas Province on April 4, 1945, after which classes opened at Lucena Catholic Hall (now Maryhill College Building).

In June 1945, the high school was relocated at the Tayabas Provincial Capitol and the Court of First Instance Building, whereby 54 students graduated, girls in Balintawak and boys in Barong Tagalog on July 28, 1945. President Manuel Roxas signed Republic Act No. 14 on September 7, 1946, renaming the province of Tayabas to Quezon: Tayabas High School became Quezon Provincial High School.

The Batas Pambansa No. 1820 renamed Quezon Provincial High School as Quezon National High School with Dr. Cesar Villariba as the author.

Progress brings about change, change brings problems, and problems brings QNHS to the front line. An adage applies: "there is no gain without pain in the service of educating people."

Vision 

Every Filipino youth shall enjoy a better quality of life due to access to quality secondary education, good moral life, economic stability, relevant cultural values, competitive work skills, strong sense of national identity and successful adjustment to rapid changing environment.

Mission 

The school aims to produce students who are both academically inclined and substantially trained in the basic work skills making them globally competitive and value-oriented through relevant and responsive curriculum.

The Coconut / Ang Niyog 

The then Tayabas High School published The Coconut in 1928 with Filemon Juntereal, Sr. as the first editor. The publication came out twice a month in a four-page tabloid. The magazine came as the graduation issue. The first Filipino adviser was Gabriel Tuazon.

The Lucena City-based publication of the school whose name had evolved to Quezon Provincial (later, National) High School amassed awards in local and national press conferences with Marie Delicia T. Unson as adviser. In the 1977 National Secondary Schools Press Conference, The Coconut reaped a golden harvest when adjudged second best high school paper in the Philippines for Bracket B, against Baguio's The Pine Tree, as The Coconut garnered the most medals overall.

The silver medal finish was the second best in the history of The Coconut, next only to the gold medal the 1972 powerhouse staff steered by editor-in-chief Samuel Organo took home. But not even that 1972 feat produced as many group medals as the big haul of the 1977 edition, which had Marie Delicia T. Unson as adviser; Normita Atienza, co-adviser; and Ricardo J. Cueto, Jr. as editor-in-chief. That year, The Coconut and The Pine Tree of Baguio so dominated the competitions they practically split the top group honors just between them.

The publication celebrated its 75th anniversary in 2003 where previous and present staff writers and advisers joined together to party. Present in the celebration was writer Joseph Morong, now a GMA 7 reporter.

Currently, the adviser of The Coconut and Ang Niyog is Abner Pureza with co-adviser Maria Aluinda Puno with Ramonito Elumbaring and Vanessa Ellaga.

Admission 
Admission to the high school is automatic for those who have completed six years of elementary school. Beginning 7th grade, education is compulsory and free to all students attending the school year. However, while general admission is automatic and free for all enrollees taking the Basic Education Program (BEP), entrance to the school's special curricular programs is highly selective and includes a competitive examination as well as interviews.

Academics

Special Program in Science Technology and Engineering (STE) 
Quezon National High School is one of only 110 specialized STEM schools in the entire country offering DepEd's Special Program in Science, Technology, and Engineering for students in grades 7 to 10. Only three types of high schools in the Philippines (STEM high schools, high schools in the Regional Science High School Union and the Philippine Science High School System) currently offer this special curriculum that places more importance in mathematics and the sciences, as well as research. Because of this highly selective environment for students, transfer students are only permitted to enroll to the STE program provided the student is coming from another STEM high school, from an RSHS or from the PSHS System.

Science, Technology, Engineering and Mathematics Program (STEM) Curriculum 
Since its implementation, this rigorous curriculum has continued to produce quality STEM-education for Quezon National High School students. In 2019, Nathaniel Reyes, a student from QNHS and an alumnus of the school's STE program, represented the Philippines at the Intel International Science and Engineering Fair (ISEF) in the United States.

Special Program in Arts (SPA) 
Special Program in the Arts is designed to cater to the needs of students who are talented in the arts. It is a program for students with potential talents in different fields of arts, namely, Music, Visual Arts, Theater Arts, Media Arts, Creative Writing and Dance. The Program offers a comprehensive secondary education centered in the arts, covering a range of art forms and disciplines. Arts education is an integral component of a balanced educational program and also provides the background for post-secondary level work.

Special Program in Journalism (SPJ) 
Special Program in Journalism is developed to enrich the experiences, hone the journalistic skills and competencies of student-writers and to strengthen free and responsible journalism. It is designed to develop the learners’ skills in mass communication, print, online and broadcast media. Its main focus is primarily on writing as a process and as an art.

Special Program for Sports (SPS) 
The Special Program in Sports is in the line with efforts of the DepEd to institutionalize a program that will identify/discover students with potential sports talents and train them for higher levels of athletic competitions. The Special Program for Sports offers a four-year secondary curriculum patterned after that of a regular high school, with specialization in sports.

Special Program in Foreign Languages - Korean (SPFL-K) 
In selective schools, various languages may be offered as electives like in an SPFL program. Quezon National High School is one of the only a handful of schools in the country offering the Special Program in the Korean language.

Senior High School 
The new high school curriculum for students in grades 11 and 12 includes core classes and specialization classes based on student choice of specialization. Students may choose a specialization based on aptitude, interests, and school capacity. Classes or courses are divided into two: Core Curriculum Subjects and Track Subjects.

There are eight learning areas under the core curriculum. These are Language, Humanities, Communication, Mathematics, Science, Social Science, Philosophy, and PE and Health. These will make up 15 core courses with the same contents and competencies but with allowed contextualization based on school's location despite of specializations of tracks and strands.

Notable alumni 
 Mau Marcelo, the first winner of Philippine Idol 
 Paz Marquez Benitez
 Fernando Sanga a.k.a. Dindo Amparo, ABS-CBN Middle East News Bureau Chief
 Joseph Morong, GMA 7 reporter
 Cong. Danilo E. Suarez, former Governor of Quezon Province

References

Most of the contents were acquired from QNHS Student HandBook (2006 Revised Edition)

External links

 QNHS Alumni Association
 QNHS Batch 2000
 Online-Community Forum for QNHS Alumni, Teachers & Students
 Lucenahin Community Website

Schools in Lucena, Philippines
High schools in Quezon
1902 establishments in the Philippines